Carey may refer to:

Names
 Carey (given name), a given name
 Carey (surname), a surname
 List of people with surname Carey

Places

Canada
 Carey Group, British Columbia; in the Pacific
 Carey Island (Nunavut) in James Bay

United Kingdom
 Carey, Herefordshire (see List of places in Herefordshire)
 Carey Baptist Church, an independent Evangelical church in Reading, England

United States
 Carey, Alabama (see List of places in Alabama: A–C)
 Carey, California
 Carey, Georgia
 Carey, Idaho
 Carey, Ohio
 Carey, Texas
 Carey, Wisconsin
 Carey, Wyoming, a locale near the eastern end of Wyoming Highway 95
 Carey Block, historic building in Wyoming
 Carey Farm Site, a prehistoric archaeological site in Delaware
 Carey Formation, a geologic formation in Oklahoma
 Carey House (disambiguation), several
 Carey Lake, a lake in Cottonwood County, in the U.S. state of Minnesota

Elsewhere
 Carey Glacier, Antarctica
 Carey Gully, South Australia
 Carey Islands, an island group off Baffin Bay, Greenland
 Carey Island, Selangor, Malaysia

Schools
 Carey Baptist Grammar School, Australia
 Carey Business School, the business school of Johns Hopkins University
 Carey College (disambiguation), several
 Carey High School (disambiguation), several
 Carey Law School, the law school of the University of Pennsylvania
 Francis King Carey School of Law, the law school of the University of Maryland
 William Carey University, a private Christian liberal arts college in Mississippi

Other uses 
 Captain Carey, U.S.A., a 1950 American film
 "Carey" (song), a 1971 song by the Canadian singer/songwriter Joni Mitchell
 Carey Bible, the first Roman Catholic version of the Bible printed in the United States

See also

 Carrie (disambiguation)
 Carry (disambiguation)
 Cary (disambiguation)
 Karey (disambiguation)
 Justice Carey (disambiguation)